Bill Vitt (May 6, 1943 - July 16, 2019, aged 76) was an American drummer and keyboardist. He worked extensively as a live performer and as a session musician.  In the 1970s he played with Brewer & Shipley, Jerry Garcia, Merl Saunders, and the Sons of Champlin.

He retired from the music business in the 1980s, but became active again in the 2000s, playing live shows and recording albums. He played the music that he loved until his death. He died with his adoring daughter, Aura, by his side, grateful and content with the life he led

Discography
Tarkio – Brewer & Shipley – 1970
Danny Cox – Danny Cox – 1971
Hooteroll? – Howard Wales and Jerry Garcia – 1971
Heavy Turbulence – Merl Saunders – 1972
Rural Space – Brewer & Shipley – 1972
Tom Fogerty – Tom Fogerty – 1972
Excalibur – Tom Fogerty – 1972
Fillmore: The Last Days – various artists – 1972 (as a member of Sons of Champlin)
Casting Pearls – Mill Valley Bunch – 1972
Fire Up – Merl Saunders – 1973
Live at Keystone – Merl Saunders, Jerry Garcia, John Kahn, Bill Vitt – 1973
Keystone Encores – Merl Saunders, Jerry Garcia, John Kahn, Bill Vitt – 1988
Fire Up Plus – Merl Saunders and Friends – 1992
ASAP – David Collini – 1992
Keepers – Merl Saunders – 1997
Side Trips, Volume One – Howard Wales and Jerry Garcia – 1998
Garcia Plays Dylan – Jerry Garcia – 2005
Well-Matched: The Best of Merl Saunders & Jerry Garcia – Merl Saunders and Jerry Garcia – 2006
State of Grace – Bill Vitt – 2008
Keystone Companions: The Complete 1973 Fantasy Recordings – Merl Saunders and Jerry Garcia – 2012
Back At It Again – Keystone Revisited – 2013
Garcia Live Volume Six – Jerry Garcia and Merl Saunders – 2016
Garcia Live Volume Nine – Jerry Garcia and Merl Saunders – 2017
Garcia Live Volume 12 – Jerry Garcia and Merl Saunders – 2019
Garcia Live Volume 15 – Jerry Garcia and Merl Saunders – 2020

References

1943 births
2019 deaths
American jazz drummers
American jazz keyboardists
Musicians from the San Francisco Bay Area
Place of birth missing
20th-century births
American rock drummers
American male drummers
American rock keyboardists
Place of death missing
20th-century American drummers
Jazz musicians from California
20th-century American male musicians
American male jazz musicians